Milton R. Stern (August 22, 1928 – July 26, 2011) was an American professor of English and American literature, who specialized in studies of the works of Herman Melville and F. Scott Fitzgerald, best known for his "landmark books" on Melville, Fitzgerald, and Hawthorne, particularly The Fine Hammered Steel of Herman Melville, and also for editing the "pioneering" four-volume American Literature Survey for the Viking Portable Library.

Background
Milton R. Stern was born on August 22, 1928, in Roxbury, Massachusetts.  His parents David and Elizabeth Stern came from Eastern Europe.  In 1949, he graduated with a BA from Northeastern University.  In 1951, he received an MA from the University of Connecticut (UConn) and in 1955 a doctorate from Michigan State University, both in American liteture.

Career
In 1955, Stern began teaching at the University of Illinois.  In 1958, he joined the English Department at UConn in 1958.  He served as founding chairman of the Connecticut Humanities Council, dedicated to spreading literacy and culture to the state. He also championed adult education.  Stern taught until retirement in 1991.

Stern was guest professor at the University of Wyoming, Smith College, and Harvard University.

Personal life and death
In 1949, Stern married Harriet Marks; they had two children.

Stern was a long-time member of the Melville Society.

Stern died age 82 on July 26, 2011, in Needham, Massachusetts. of complications due to stroke.

Awards
 1960:  American Council of Learned Societies 
 1964-1965: Fulbright professor at  University of Warsaw
 1969: Outstanding Teacher Award at University of Connecticut
 1971: Guggenheim Fellowship in American Literary
 1976: First Alumni Association Distinguished Professor award at University of Connecticut
 1977:  Fellow at the National Humanities Institute at Yale University
 1979:  Fellow at the Modern Media Institute Center in St. Petersburg, Florida
 1981:  Outstanding Alumnus in Arts and the Humanities from Northeastern University
 1983:  First Wilbur Cross Award winner conferred by the Connecticut Humanities Council
 1985:  Celebrated Teacher by the Associated Departments of English Program of the Modern Language Association
 1996: Honorary Life Member of the F. Scott Fitzgerald Society

Works
Stern was an expert on Herman Melville, the American transcendentalists, and F. Scott Fitzgerald. He wrote books of literary criticism, numerous articles, reviews, and co-edited an anthology of American literature.  He wrote "landmark books" on Melville, Fitzgerald, and Hawthorne.  He also edited the "pioneering" four-volume American Literature Survey for the Viking Portable Library.

The following list comes from the catalog of the Library of Congress:  
 The Fine Hammered Steel of Herman Melville; With a Checklist of Melville Studies (1957)
 Discussions of Moby-Dick (1960)
 American Literature Survey: Nation and Regions, 1860-1900, edited with Seymour L. Gross (1962, 1968, 1975, 1977)
 House of the seven gables, edited with introduction (1965, 1981)
 First years in college; preparing students for a successful college career, edited with * * Golden moment: the novels of F. Scott Fitzgerald (1970)
 The Golden Moment:  The Novels of F. Scott Fitzgerald (1970)
 Billy Budd, sailor; an inside narrative, edited (1975)
 The Twentieth Century (1978)
 Critical Essays on Herman Melville's Typee, edited (1982)
 Power and conflict in continuing professional education, edited (1983)
 Critical essays on F. Scott Fitzgerald's Tender is the night, edited (1986)
 Contexts for Hawthorne: The Marble Faun and the Politics of Openness and Closure in American Literature (1991)
 The Learning Society:  Continuing Education at NYU, Michigan, and UC Berkeley, 1946-1991 (1993)
 Tender is the Night: The Broken Universe (1994)
 F. Scott Fitzgerald in the twenty-first century, edited with Jackson R. Bryer and Ruth Prigozy (2003)
 [Unpublished, 600-page memoir]

See also
 Herman Melville 
 F. Scott Fitzgerald

References

20th-century American educators
University of Illinois Urbana-Champaign faculty
University of Connecticut faculty
Northeastern University alumni
University of Connecticut alumni
Michigan State University alumni
1928 births
2011 deaths